Bethesda is an unincorporated community in Greene County, in the U.S. state of Georgia.

History
Bethesda is a name derived from Hebrew meaning "house of mercy".

References

Unincorporated communities in Greene County, Georgia
Unincorporated communities in Georgia (U.S. state)